Pokrovske is a village (a selo) in the Bakhmut Raion (district) of Donetsk Oblast in the East of Ukraine. 

Pokrovske was reportedly captured by Russian forces on 27 July 2022, during the eastern Ukraine offensive of the 2022 Russian invasion of Ukraine.

References

Villages in Bakhmut Raion